Daniele Croce (born 9 September 1982) is an Italian footballer who plays as a central midfielder.

Club career

Pescara
Born in Giulianova, Abruzzo, Croce started his career at Abruzzese club Pescara.

Arezzo
Croce was signed by fellow Serie B club Arezzo in a co-ownership deal for €600,000 on 30 August 2006.

In June 2007 Arezzo signed Croce outright for another €431,000. Arezzo folded in 2010.

Alessandria & Sorrento
In 2010 Croce joined Alessandria. In 2011, he was signed by Sorrento.

Empoli
In 2012, he returned to Serie B with Empoli F.C. The club promoted back to Serie A in 2014. On 24 May 2016 he signed a new 1-year contract with the club.

Cremonese
After Empoli relegated in 2017, Croce joined Serie B club Cremonese on a free transfer.

References

External links

 legaserieb profile 
 AIC profile (data by football.it) 

Living people
People from Giulianova
Footballers from Abruzzo
1982 births
Italian footballers
Association football midfielders
Delfino Pescara 1936 players
Taranto F.C. 1927 players
S.S. Arezzo players
A.C. Cesena players
U.S. Alessandria Calcio 1912 players
A.S.D. Sorrento players
Empoli F.C. players
U.S. Cremonese players
Serie A players
Serie B players
Sportspeople from the Province of Teramo